Michael Rey (born in Sarasota, Florida 1979) is an American abstract painter. Rey lives and works in Los Angeles, California.

Education 
Rey received his BFA in 2002 from Ringling School of Art and Design, Sarasota, Florida, and his MFA in 2008 from the Art Center College of Design, Pasadena, CA.

Exhibitions

Solo exhibitions
Philip Martin Gallery, Los Angeles, CA, 2020
Cherry and Martin, Los Angeles, CA, 2017
Michael Rey, Office Baroque, Brussels, Belgium, 2017
PLYDIS KAVE, Zero, Milan, Italy, 2016
Michael Rey, Office Baroque, Brussels, Belgium, 2015 
About a Work #4, Zero, Milan, Italy, 2015 
OMES, Cherry and Martin, Los Angeles, CA, 2015
Michael Rey, Cherry and Martin 2732, Los Angeles, CA, 2014 
IBJECT, Michael Rey, Room East, New York, NY, 2014
Dracula Plus Plus, Young Art, Los Angeles, CA, 2011

Selected group exhibitions
Group Exhibition 2017, James Fuentes Gallery, New York, NY, 2017 
Top Heavy: Jennifer Boysen, Katy Cowan, Michael Rey, Cherry and Martin, Los Angeles, CA, 2017
Expanded Fields, Nymphius Projekte, Berlin, Germany, 2016 
Back To Basics, The Frederick R. Weisman Museum of Art, Malibu, CA, 2015 
Vom Grossen und Ganzen, Herbert Gerisch-Stiftung, Neumünster, DE, 2015
Object Painting - Painting Object, Jonathan Viner, London, UK, 2015 
Rio (curated by Louis-Philippe Van Eeckhoutte), Office Baroque, Brussels, Belgium, 2015
A Peg to Hang It On, White Flag Projects, St. Louis, MO, 2015
Crunchy, Marianne Boesky Gallery, New York, NY, 2015
Amy Feldman/Michael Rey, Freddy, Baltimore, MD, 2014
Another Cats Show, 356 Mission, Los Angeles, CA, 2014
Where were you?, Lisson Gallery, London, UK, 2014
Green Circle, Black Diamond, Ratio 3, San Francisco, CA, 2014
Hephaestus, Office Baroque, Brussels, Belgium, 2014
Alexandre da Cunha, Michael Rey, Michael Williams, B. Wurtz, Office Baroque, Antwerp, Belgium, 2013
Chasm of the Supernova, Center for the Arts Eagle Rock, Los Angeles, CA, 2012
Animalfaith - Doot Doot (D.B. Sweeney), JB Jurve, Los Angeles, CA, 2010
Ooga Booga Reading Room, Swiss Institute Contemporary Art, New York, NY, 2010
Is What It Is What It Is, Pacific Design Center, West Hollywood, CA, 2009
Sculpture Park, Karyn Lovegrove Gallery, Los Angeles, CA, 2009
Cocktail Hour with Skip Arnold and Friends, Bonelli Contemporary, Los Angeles, CA, 2008
My Buddy, UCLA New Wight Biennial, New Wight Gallery, Los Angeles, CA, 2007

Public collections
Weisman Art Museum, Minneapolis, MN
MoMCA Trento and Reovereto, Trento, Italy
Sabanci Museum, Istanbul, Turkey
ADN Collection, Bolzano, Italy
Weisman Foundation, Los Angeles, CA
Fondazione Sandretto Re Rebaudengo, Turin, Italy

References

External links 
Michael Rey: Artists’ website
Cherry & Martin
Bria, Ginevra. "Michael Rey e l'orlo del mondo. A Milano, Artribune, October 3, 2016.
Cutajar, Mario, Michael Rey 'PLYDIS KAVE' at ZERO..., Milan, Mousse Magazine, October 2016.
Michael Rey at ZERO... gallery: The uncanny is not something you can produce at will, Conceptual Fine Arts, September 27, 2016. 
Natalia Masewicz, Wall Sculpture Opens Up “Expanded Fields” at Nymphius Projekte Berlin, Conceptual Fine Arts, February 1, 2016.
Michael Rey at Office Baroque, Art Viewer, September 21, 2015.
Michael Rey “IBJECT” at Room East, New York, Mousse Magazine, May 25, 2014
Gopnik, Blake. "Michael Rey's Imaginary Readymades," Blouin Art Info (online), May 1, 2014.
Wu, Su., In L.A., Blurring the lines Between Art and Housewares, The New York Times Style Magazine, January 29, 2014.
Tuck, Geoff, Initial and continuing thoughts on Michael Rey’s show at Young Art, notes on looking, November 8, 2011.

1979 births
Living people
People from Sarasota, Florida
American abstract artists
Abstract painters
21st-century American painters
21st-century American male artists
American contemporary painters